Alexander Semenovich Vinokurov (born 12 
October 1982 Moscow) is a Russian businessman. He is one of the main owners of the privately held investment company Marathon Group and largest shareholder of retailer Magnit. Vinokurov was added to the EU Sanctions List on 9 March 2022 for providing a substantial source of revenue to the government of the Russian Federation during the Russo-Ukrainian War.

Early life
Sasha Vinokurov was born in Moscow on 12 October 1982 to Semyon Vinokurov.

Education  
In 2004, Vinokurov graduated with honours from the faculty of economics of the University of Cambridge. He received a BA in economics. During the period of his studies, he established a student organisation, and was elected its president.

Business 

In 2001, he interned at the Troika Dialog, which was under the control of Andrey Borodin with a large stake owned by Ruben Vardanyan who recommended to Vinokurov to gain employment at Morgan Stanley.

In 2004, Vinokurov joined the investment banking division of Morgan Stanley (London).

In 2006, he returned to Russia as vice-president of TPG Capital (the world's largest private equity investment firm, with $100 billion in assets under its management), co-founding the company's Russian office. He was involved in acquisitions of a number of major assets, including shares in VTB upon the state bank's privatisation, stakes in the Moscow office centres White Square and White Gardens, Ontex S.A. (a Belgian manufacturer of personal hygiene products with Russian production facilities), Strauss Coffee and the Lenta hypermarket chain.

In 2011, Vinokurov became president of Summa Group, a diversified private holding company, which has significant investments in port and rail logistics, engineering, construction, telecommunications, oil and gas, oil trading and agriculture. Major deals concluded during his tenure included the acquisition of a 71% stake in Fesco from Sergey Generalov's Industrial Investors and the purchase of a 50% stake in United Grain Company from the state.

In 2014, he became CEO of A1, the investment arm of Alfa Group, which he left in May 2017. Major transactions by A1 during Vinokurov's time there included the sale of Formula Kino, Russia's second-largest cinema chain, to structures controlled by Alexander Mamut (RUB 6.75–7.65 billion)); acquisition of a stake in Polyplastic (one of Russia's largest manufacturers of plastic pipes), and others.

From 2017, Vinokurov focused on developing co-owned Marathon Group. Marathon Group was founded in 2017 by Vinokurov and Sergei Zakharov. The Company primarily focuses on strategic investments in retail, FMCG, infrastructure and other projects with subsequent development of the assets.  Current investments of Marathon Group include shareholdings in a leading food retail chain Magnit, the largest franchisee of quick service restaurants in Russia, Demetra-Holding (the largest vertically integrated grain holding company in Russia with export logistics and trading assets) and Bentus Laboratories (producer of hand sanitizers). Recent highlights: turn-around and sale of pharmaceutical companies Sintez, Biocom and Fort, of pharmaceutical distributor SIA Group, and financial investment in Fix Price (a leading variety value retailer in Russia).

, Vinokurov controls stakes in such companies as one of Russia's largest food retailer Magnit,  an international restaurant brand KFC, a division of Yum! Brands, Inc. (NYSE: YUM), Demetra Holding – Russian grain exports infrastructure company and Santinelle, leading Russia's producer of instant hand sanitisers.

Civic activities
Vinokurov is a member of the supervisory board of the Russian Cycling Federation and Rugby Union of Russia, co-founder of Marathon-Tula Cycling Team.

Since 2021, he is a board member of Russian Union of Industrialists and Entrepreneurs (RSPP).

Sanctions
Vinokurov was added to the EU Sanctions List on 9 March 2022 for providing a substantial source of revenue to the government of the Russian Federation.

Family and personal life 
Vinokurov is married to Ekaterina Vinokurova (née Lavrova) (born 1982 New York City), daughter of the Minister of Foreign Affairs of the Russian Federation Sergey Lavrov. She graduated from Manhattan's The Dwight School, majored in political science receiving a degree from Columbia University, and then studied for two years at the London School of Economics and received her master's in economics from there in 2006. They have three children.

Vinokurov is fond of sports. He sponsored the Russian aquabike championship at 2019. Vinokurov's Marathon Group is also sponsor for FC Dynamo Moscow.

Notes

References

1982 births
Living people
Businesspeople from Moscow
Alumni of the University of Cambridge
Russian businesspeople in the United Kingdom